The main events in the 2023 chess calendar are the World Chess Championship 2023 and Women's World Chess Championship 2023.

2023 tournaments 

 World Chess Championship 2023
 Women's World Chess Championship 2023
 Champions Chess Tour 2023
 FIDE Women's Grand Prix 2022–23
 Tata Steel Chess Tournament 2023
 Women's Candidates Tournament 2022–23

References

External links 
 Calendar by FIDE
 2023 Chess Calendar by chess24.com
 Chess Calendar by Lichess
 Chess Calendar by Chess.com

 
21st century in chess
Chess by year
2023 sport-related lists